The first ladies and gentlemen of Texas, both under the Republic of Texas and the State of Texas, have been a wide spectrum of personalities and abilities. The position of first spouse has been defined by individual achievements and perspectives of  official spouses  for over 75 years.  Some enjoyed their positions and seized the opportunity to help shape the state's history. Others were there reluctantly.

Margaret Lea Houston can arguably be called the original first lady of Texas. Hannah Estey Burnet's husband  David G. Burnet was ad interim Republic president before Sam Houston became the official first president. During Houston's first term, he was in the process of obtaining a divorce from Eliza Allen, his estranged wife in Tennessee. Houston's 1838-41 successor Mirabeau B. Lamar was a widower during his term in office. 

Margaret campaigned with her new husband when Houston ran for a second term as president, and rode in the presidential parade, in spite of her dislike of politics. There was no government housing for the family of the president of the Republic. The Houstons divided their time among properties they owned.  No role model existed for Margaret. She saw herself not as a political wife, but as a homebody who was responsible for the health, welfare and religious education of her husband and her children. She became a virtual recluse when Sam Houston was elected Governor of Texas and refused any visitors inside the mansion except her own relatives. Margaret Lea Houston's great-great granddaughter Jean Houston Baldwin Daniel also served as First Lady of Texas 1957–1963.

Frances Cox Henderson, wife of the state's first governor James Pinckney Henderson, was an outgoing supporter of women's suffrage, and a multi-linguist who had been a book translator before she met Henderson.

The only first gentleman the state has had was James E. Ferguson, who first served as governor. He was impeached on charges of misapplication of public funds, and failing to respect and enforce the banking laws of the state and resigned from office in 1917.  When his wife Miriam A. Ferguson won two non-consecutive terms as governor, James Ferguson became the state's only first gentleman.

Mildred Paxton Moody had been a newspaper columnist and a professor at Hardin-Simmons University before she married Dan Moody. She used her influence as a former first lady to get the Texas State Legislature to create the Board of Mansion Supervisors to oversee the finances of maintaining the official residence. Rita Crocker Clements  not only restored the Governor's Mansion, but also had been a mover and shaker in politics decades before she married Bill Clements. Former first lady Anita Thigpen Perry has a background in nursing and two nursing educational endowments bear her name.

Republic of Texas

State of Texas

Notes

Footnotes

Citations

References

Further reading

External links
TWU Dress Collection of First Ladies of Texas

 
 
History of women in Texas
Lists of people from Texas
Spouses of Texas politicians
Governor of Texas